The Women's 100m T13 had its competition held on September 16, with the first round at 9:15 and the Final at 18:18.

Medalists

Results

References
Round 1 - Heat 1
Round 1 - Heat 2
Round 1 - Heat 3
Final

Athletics at the 2008 Summer Paralympics
2008 in women's athletics